Catasauqua Creek is an ENE–SSW oriented creek draining  (straight line distance) from springs of the Blue Mountain barrier ridge several miles below the Lehigh Gap in the ridge-and-valley Appalachians located upriver and opposite from Allentown in Lehigh and Northampton counties in the Lehigh Valley region of eastern Pennsylvania. 
 
The mouth of the creek outlets directly opposite West Catasauqua just below Race Street bridge across the Lehigh River, the latest of the several successor structures built to replace the original wooden bridge built in 1839-1840 to carry heavy wagons of iron ore to the new furnaces being built within the new village aborning as the Lehigh Crane Iron Company created the infrastructure to father the iron and steel industry of the Lehigh Valley.  The head of the Creek begins in the Dannersville neighborhood of Bath at 40°44′16″N latitude 75°25′58″W longitude (or 40.737849,-75.432824) forming a steep sided ravine almost immediately as it gathers waters over its first mile.  By the time it passes Sauerkraut Hill its gathered two major tributary creeks and is leaving steeper terrain for a gentler run over the last four miles or so remaining to its mouth.

Catasauqua Creek was the water course along which six of the first eight successful anthracite fueled iron smelting hot blast furnaces in North America were erected for it was chosen in 1839 as a mill stream by Erskine Hazard & Josiah White, co-founders of the Lehigh Coal & Navigation Company, along which to establish their new subsidiary: the Lehigh Crane Iron Company with imported Welsh expert David Thomas as superintendent to construct and operate blast furnaces.<ref
 name=Thomas>
</ref>
The area first appears in the historical record as a manorial deed in Penns times, but a surnames analysis by [TBDL-author of History of Northampton County] in his 1877 history of Northampton County shows the area was first settled by Irish emigrants (late 1600s–early 1700s) who became bought out by descendants of German extraction. 
 
By late 1839, the creek was reshaped to begin providing water power for producing the first North American pig iron using anthracite as the principle fuel, a new breakthrough product, anthracite iron — that in conjunction with the new wonder fuel, anthracite (which began pouring down the Lehigh Canal in 1820), effectively boot strapped the American Industrial Revolution. The first successful anthracite blow and cast of iron occurred there on July, 4th 1840 about which Bartholomew & Metz note:

 
Catasauqua Creek is a left bank tributary entering from the East shore of the historic Lehigh River/Canal and is often known as "Catty Creek".

Variant names
Over the years, the occupants of Catasauqua underwent a great deal of change, with initial settlers shown to be Irish, while by the 1810s the population was mainly of German descent. This may account for the variety of alternative names of the creek.
 
Variant Names registered by the :
  Caladaqua Creek,  Caladoque Creek,  Calandaqua Creek,
  Calesoque Creek,  Calisuk Creek,  Catasocque Creek,
  Coladaque Creek,  Colesauque Creek,  Colesoque Creek,
  Colesquque Creek,  Collasauque Creek,  Gatasaque Creek,
  Gattoshacki Creek,  Gottoschacki Creek,  Gottshacki Creek,
 and  Mill Creek

Its origin is near Miller State Pond in East Allen Township. It flows through Allen Township, North Catasauqua and finally, into Catasauqua, where it flows into the Lehigh Canal and Lehigh River. Along its course, it passes Catasauqua High School and flows through Willowbrook Golf Course in North Catasauqua and through Catasauqua Park.

References

Rivers of Lehigh County, Pennsylvania
Rivers of Pennsylvania
Rivers of Northampton County, Pennsylvania